Maximilian Emanuel can refer to:

Maximilian II Emanuel, Elector of Bavaria
Duke Maximilian Emanuel  in Bavaria
Maximilian Emanuel  of Württemberg-Winnental
Maximilian, Prince of Hornes 
Max Emanuel Ainmiller